Owen Morse may refer to:

 Owen Morse, member of American comedy-juggling duo The Passing Zone
 Owen Morse (politician) (1882–1965), Canadian politician